HD 188753 is a hierarchical triple star system approximately 151 light-years away in the constellation of Cygnus, the Swan. In 2005, an extrasolar planet was announced to be orbiting the primary star (designated HD 188753 A) in the system. Follow-up measurements by an independent group in 2007 did not confirm the planet's existence.

Stellar components 

The primary star, HD 188753 A, is similar to the Sun with a mass only 6% larger and a stellar classification of G8V. The pair have estimated masses of 0.96 and 0.67 solar masses. They orbit the primary with a period of about 25.7 years and an orbital eccentricity of about 0.50. The periastron distance of this orbit is 6.2 AU.

Possible planet 

In 2005 the discovery of a candidate planet orbiting the primary star of the triple star system was announced.  This planet, which received the designation HD 188753 Ab, was announced by a Polish astronomer working in the United States, Dr. Maciej Konacki. This would not be the first known planet in a triple star system – for example, the planet 16 Cygni Bb had been discovered earlier, orbiting one of the components of a wide triple system also in the constellation of Cygnus.

Since HD 188753 Ab was believed to be orbiting in a multi-star system, Konacki referred to planets of this type as "Tatooine planets" after Luke Skywalker's home world. The detection of this planet has been challenged by Eggenberger et al.

The candidate planet, a hot Jupiter gas giant slightly more massive than Jupiter, was thought to orbit the star HD 188753 A once every 80 hours or so (3.3 days), at a distance of about 8 million kilometers, a twentieth of the distance between Earth and the Sun. The existence of HD 188753 Ab in a relatively close triple star system challenged the current models of planet formation. The current idea is that giant planets form in the outer reaches of their system (in orbits similar to those of Jupiter and Saturn).  Once formed, some of these planets may migrate close to their stars, becoming hot Jupiters.  The theoretical difficulty in understanding HD 188753 Ab is that any protoplanetary disk would have ended around 1 astronomical unit from the primary star (due to the presence of the secondary stars).  A Jovian planet should not have been able to form so close to the primary, and with no disk material beyond 1 AU, a planet should not have been able to form beyond that distance to migrate inward.  One of the possibilities suggested that the planet formed before the secondary stars had reached their current configuration.  This suggests that the two secondary stars were once more distant than they are now.

An attempt to confirm the discovery failed. In 2007, a team at the Geneva Observatory stated that they had the precision and sampling rate sufficient to have detected the would-be planet, and that they did not detect it. Konacki responded to this, stating that the precision of the follow-up measurements was not sufficient to confirm or deny the planet's existence and that he planned to release an update in 2007. , no update appears to have been published.

See also 
 51 Pegasi
 Alpha Centauri
 Polaris

References

External links 
 
 

G-type main-sequence stars
Triple star systems
Hypothetical planetary systems
Cygnus (constellation)
Durchmusterung objects
188753
098001